WBC Maritsa Plovdiv is a Bulgarian women's basketball club from Plovdiv. It won three national championships in a row between 1971 and 1974, and in 1980 and 1981 it reached the Ronchetti Cup's final, losing respectively to BC Levski Sofia and Montmontaza Zagreb.

Titles
 Bulgarian Championship (3)
  1971, 1972, 1974
 Bulgarian Cup (1)
  1996
Ronchetti Cup Runner-Up (2)
  1979, 1980

References

Women's basketball teams in Bulgaria
Sport in Plovdiv